Sonder may refer to:

Geography
Mount Sonder, mountain in Australia
Sonder, village in Minahasa Regency, Indonesia

People
Otto Wilhelm Sonder (1812–1881), German botanist and pharmacist

Other uses
 Sonder (Dermot Kennedy album), a 2022 album by Irish singer Dermot Kennedy
 Sonder (Tesseract album), a 2018 album by British band Tesseract
 Sonder (band), 2016 band formed by Brent Faiyaz
Sonder Corp., an American apartment-hotel company
Sonder Design, Australian design company
Sonder-Kfz 1, armoured car used by East German riot police in the 1950s and 1960s
 Sonder, a word invented by John Koenig, see The Dictionary of Obscure Sorrows#Notable_words

See also
Sonderkommando